Gerard Walsh (born 14 March 1997) is an Irish hurler who plays for Antrim Championship club O'Donovan Rossa and at inter-county level with the Antrim senior hurling team. He usually lines out as a full-back.

Career

A member of the O'Donovan Rossa club, Walsh first came to prominence with the club's senior team that won the 2015 All-Ireland Intermediate Club Championship title after a defeat of Kilburn Gaels. He made his first appearance on the inter-county scene as a member of the Antrim minor team that won consecutive Ulster Minor Championship titles in 2014 and 2015 before winning an Ulster Under-21 Championship title in 2016. Walsh made his debut with the Antrim senior hurling team during the 2018 Walsh Cup and lined out at wing-back for their 2020 Joe McDonagh Cup success.

Honours

O'Donovan Rossa
All-Ireland Intermediate Club Hurling Championship: 2015
Ulster Intermediate Club Hurling Championship: 2014
Antrim Intermediate Hurling Championship: 2014

Antrim
Joe McDonagh Cup: 2020
Ulster Under-21 Hurling Championship: 2016
Ulster Minor Hurling Championship: 2014, 2015

References

External links
Gerard Walsh profile at the Antrim GAA website

1997 births
Living people
O'Donovan Rossa (Antrim) hurlers
Antrim inter-county hurlers